The 2019 Football Tasmania season was the sixth season of soccer under the restructured format in Tasmania. The men's competitions consisted of three major divisions across the State. The overall premier qualified for the National Premier Leagues finals series, competing with the other state federation champions in a final knock-out tournament to decide the National Premier Leagues Champion for 2019.

Men's Competitions

2019 NPL Tasmania
The 2018 NPL Tasmania season was played as a triple round-robin over 21 rounds. The NPL Premier qualifies for the national NPL finals series.

2019 Tasmanian Championships

2019 Northern Championship
The 2018 Northern Championship was the sixth edition of the Northern Championship as the second level domestic association football competition in Tasmania. The league consisted of 8 teams, playing 21 matches, facing each opponent thrice.

2019 Southern Championship
The 2019 Southern Championship was the sixth edition of the Southern Championship as the second level domestic association football competition in Tasmania. The league consisted of 8 teams, playing 21 matches, playing each opponent thrice.

Women's Competitions

2019 Women's Super League

The 2019 Women's Super League season is the fourth edition of the statewide Tasmanian women's association football league. The league consisted of six clubs playing each opponent four times.

Cup competitions

 

The Milan Lakoseljac Cup competition also served as the Tasmanian Preliminary Rounds for the 2019 FFA Cup. South Hobart entered at the Round of 32, where they were eliminated.

References

2019 in Australian soccer
Football Federation Tasmania seasons